Stepan Vasilievich Chervonenko (born , Okip, Poltava Oblast, Russian Empire, died 11 July 2003, Moscow, Russian Federation) was the Soviet ambassador to Peking in 1961. Whilst serving as the ambassador to Peking, Chervonenko was present during the breakup of Sino-Soviet Relations. In a meeting with the Vice Premier Chen Yi, Chervonenko was told that Moscow should stop "severing the friendship between the two countries."  Chervonenko also served in Czechoslovakia in 1968 (in office from 1965 until 1973, preceded by Mikhail Zimyanin, succeeded by Vladimir Matskevich). Chervonenko is known for his role in suppressing the Prague Spring of 1968. In 1973 he was appointed Soviet Ambassador to France, a post which he retained until 1983. He was subsequently appointed head of the Cadres Abroad department of the CPSU Central Committee. Spouse Lyudmila Chikolini (1917–2002) was a historian.

References

Further reading 
 

1915 births
2003 deaths
Ambassadors of the Soviet Union to Czechoslovakia
Ambassadors of the Soviet Union to France
Ambassadors of the Soviet Union to China
Burials in Troyekurovskoye Cemetery